The 1946 Arkansas AM&N Golden Lions football team represented Arkansas AM&N (now known as University of Arkansas at Pine Bluff) in the Southwestern Athletic Conference (SWAC) during the 1946 college football season. In their first year under head coach Lamar Allen, the Golden Lions compiled an 8–2–1 record (3–2–1 against SWAC opponents), defeated Lane in the Cattle Bowl, and outscored all opponents by a total of 130 to 85.

The Dickinson System rated Arkansas AM&N as the No. 6 black college football team for 1946.

Schedule

References

Arkansas AMandN
Arkansas–Pine Bluff Golden Lions football seasons
Arkansas AMandN